Burj Rafal (Arabic: برج رافال) is a skyscraper hotel in Riyadh, Saudi Arabia. It opened in January 2014, its 70 floors constructed on an exclusive 20,000 sqm plot.

About 
The skyscraper has about 350 rooms and is the tallest residential building in Riyadh. It is also one of the tallest hotels in the world. The building had a total cost of about $320 million.

See also 
List of tallest buildings in Saudi Arabia

References

External links 
Official site

Hotel buildings completed in 2013
Skyscrapers in Riyadh
Residential skyscrapers in Saudi Arabia
Skyscraper office buildings in Saudi Arabia
Skyscraper hotels in Saudi Arabia